Hiri Motu, also known as Police Motu, Pidgin Motu, or just Hiri, is a language of Papua New Guinea, which is spoken in surrounding areas of Port Moresby (Capital of Papua New Guinea).

It is a simplified version of Motu, from the Austronesian language family. Although it is strictly neither a pidgin nor a creole, it possesses some features from both language types. Phonological and grammatical differences make Hiri Motu not mutually intelligible with Motu. The languages are lexically very similar, and retain a common, albeit simplified, Austronesian syntactical basis. It has also been influenced to some degree by Tok Pisin.

Even in the areas where it was once well established as a lingua franca, the use of Hiri Motu has been declining in favour of Tok Pisin and English for many years. The language has some statutory recognition.

Origin of Hiri Motu 

The term hiri is the name for the traditional trade voyages that created a culture and style of living for the Motu people. Hiri Motu became a common language for a police force known as Police Motu.

The name Hiri Motu was conceptualised in the early 1970s during a conference held by the Department of Information and Extension Services. During this conference, the committee recommended the name Hiri Motu for several reasons.

 The language's history is older than the name Police Motu implies. This was recommended because it was simplified from the language of the Motu people, which was the language used when they traded goods with their customers.
 Police Motu at the time was never used as a language of trade or social contact. Since the unity of New Guinea Police Force in 1946, Police Motu had lost most of its functions in police work. Pidgin was adopted at that time and was used with the majority of the police force.
 The committee thought that the new name should have some meaning behind it. Instead of associating a language to the police, they thought the language should reflect the legacy of the language and how it is used in everyday life.

Motu people 
Motu people are native inhabitants of Papua New Guinea who live along the southern coastal line of their country. They typically live in dry areas, on the leeward side of the mountain, where dry seasons are harsh on the people who live there. Traditional Hiri voyages carried prized treasures to the people of the Gulf of Papua.

Dialects 
Hiri Motu has two dialects: "Austronesian" and "Papuan". Both dialects are Austronesian in both grammar and vocabulary due to their derivation from Motu; the dialect names refer to the first languages spoken by users of this lingua franca. The "Papuan" dialect (also called "non-central") was more widely spoken and was, at least from about 1964, used as the standard for official publications. The "Austronesian" (or "central") dialect is closer to Motu in grammar and phonology, and its vocabulary is both more extensive and closer to the original language. It was the prestige dialect, which was regarded by speakers as being more "correct".

The distinction between Motu and its "pidgin" dialects has been described as blurred. They form a continuum from the original "pure" language, through the established creoles, to what some writers have suggested constitutes a form of "Hiri Motu–based pidgin" used as a contact language with people who had not fully acquired Hiri Motu, such as the Eleman and Koriki.

Phonology

Syntax

Personal pronouns 
In the Hiri Motu language, the distinction between "inclusive" and "exclusive" forms of 'we' is very important. In the former case, 'we' applies to the speaker and listener while in the latter case 'we' does not include the listener.

Possessives 

  'my'
  'your (singular)'
  'your (plural)'
  'his, her, its'
  'their'

The first half of the word may be taken out of the word.

Postpositions 
Hiri Motu uses postpositions. For example,  means 'in the box',  means 'on the table', and  means 'at Konedobu (a location in Papua)'.

Because Hiri Motu does not allow double vowels,  will often fuse with the word. Some examples:

  →  – 'in, inside'
  →  – 'on, on top of'

Word order 
There are two word orders in Hiri Motu: subject–object–verb (SOV) and object-subject-verb (OSV), both of which can be used interchangeably (OSV is more common in Hiri Motu). These sentence structures either start with a subject which is followed by an object, or vice versa start with an object which is followed by a subject, and both end with a verb. The sentence always ends with a verb regardless of the word order.

As word order can be arbitrarily chosen, ambiguity may arise in some cases.

For example,  can either mean 'This boy killed a big pig' or 'A big pig killed this boy'. To solve this, a subject marker can be used.

With it, the sentence reads:  (literally, 'This boy <subject marker>, a big pig he killed.') - 'This boy killed a big pig.'

The subject marker should only be used in cases where ambiguity occurs. Subject markers are never used in sentences with intransitive verbs.

Interrogatives 

 is sometimes spelt and pronounced .

 always follows the noun it is referring to, while  always follows it.

Questions should be asked affirmatively, as otherwise some of the answers received can be confusing.

For example, receiving the reply  ('yes') to the question  ('hasn't he come?') can mean 'Yes, he hasn't come yet'. If the person has arrived, the answer would be:  ('No, he has come').

Conjunctions 

Examples:

  ('Walk carefully, lest you fall.')
  ('He went to the river (in order) to catch fish.')

'To be' and 'to have' 
When 'to be' is used as a connecting word, the particles  and  can be used and are interchangeable.

For example:  or  both mean 'he is a good boy'.

There is no Hiri Motu verb form of 'to have' in the sense of possession. In true Hiri Motu, a local would express that they have a dog with the phrase  for 'I have a dog', (literally, 'I with my dog'.) There are no standards for these expressions in Hiri Motu.

Numbers 

The numbers 1–5 in Hiri Motu are, respectively, . The number system in Hiri Motu goes up to 100,000. Many of the numbers in Hiri Motu are polysyllabic. Most Papuans know the English number system and use that instead.

History 

The language has a history pre-dating European contact; it developed among members of the Hiri trade cycle (mainly in sago and clay pots) between the Motu people and their neighbours on the southeast coast of the island of New Guinea. In early European colonial days, the use of Hiri Motu was spread due to its adoption by the Royal Papuan Constabulary (hence the name Police Motu). By the early 1960s, Hiri Motu was the lingua franca of a large part of the country. It was the first language for many people whose parents came from different language groups (typically the children of policemen and other public servants).

Since the early 1970s, if not earlier, the use of Hiri Motu as a day-to-day lingua franca in its old "range" has been gradually declining in favour of English and Tok Pisin. Today its speakers tend to be elderly and concentrated in Central and Gulf provinces. Younger speakers of the "parent language" (Motu proper) tend to be unfamiliar with Hiri Motu, and few of them understand or speak it well.

References 
(1968) Percy Chatterton, A Grammar Of The Motu Language of Papua.

(1976) Dictionary Working Committee on Hiri Motu, The Dictionary and Grammar of Hiri Motu.

Notes

Bibliography
 
 
 Lister-Turner, R and Clark, J.B. (1931), A Dictionary of the Motu Language of Papua, 2nd Edition (P. Chatterton, ed). Sydney, New South Wales: Government Printer.
 Brett, Richard; Brown, Raymond; Brown, Ruth and Foreman, Velma. (1962), A Survey of Motu and Police Motu. Ukarumpa, Papua New Guinea: Summer Institute of Linguistics.

External links 

 Paradisec has a number of collections with Hiri Motu language materials

Pidgins and creoles
Languages of Papua New Guinea
Law enforcement in Papua New Guinea